Turkish Cypriot folk dances are dances that have been passed down through Turkish Cypriot culture.

International membership
Northern Cyprus became a member of Federation of International Dance Festivals (FIDAF) in 2014.

Types of Turkish Cypriot folk dances

Zeibekiko

See also
Greek dances
Sirto
Tamzara
Kochari
Horon (dance)
Halay
Turkish dance

References

European folk dances
Middle Eastern dances
Folk Dances